Godzilla 2: War of the Monsters is a video game for the Nintendo Entertainment System published exclusively in North America by Toho in 1992. It was the second game based on the Godzilla franchise to be released for a Nintendo console, following 1988's Godzilla: Monster of Monsters; and the third overall game to be released on a Nintendo platform, after the 1990 handheld game for Game Boy.

The player controls military forces trying to prevent Godzilla and other giant monsters such as Mothra, Hedorah, Rodan, Baragon and King Ghidorah.

Plot

Japan is being ravaged by bizarre and powerful giant monsters.

A reptilian creature called Baragon is creating earthquakes in an oil refinery, a high-speed pterosaur named Rodan is leaving sonic booms in his wake, a hideous blob of slime called Hedorah is feeding off of the city's toxic waste and growing larger every second, a giant caterpillar named Mothra is laying eggs in different parts of town, a terrible three-headed hydra named King Ghidorah is bringing fire to the skies, and Godzilla is plowing through everything around him. To make matters worse, a fleet of alien saucers has begun an invasion.

Only the Allied Defense Forces can stop them.

Monsters
Godzilla: The titular and most common monster, and one of the most powerful. If Godzilla seeks out an H-Bomb, he will end the game.
Baragon: A tunneling creature, his special ability is to dig underground and become invisible, but he can be detected by a radar car.
Rodan: A flying, highly mobile monster. Rodan can heal if he is over a volcano. Also, he will be weak if he's on the ground.
Hedorah: A monster made of polluted slime. In water he is invincible and almost always, heals.
King Ghidorah: A three-headed space dragon, possibly the most powerful monster ever.
Mothra: The moth monster, also appears in larva form. Initially an enemy, but in later missions becomes a friendly unit if the player finds its egg.
UFO: A UFO. Fires beams that can initially be reflected with the Super X2's laser, but in later missions is so powerful that it punches right through.

External links

Godzilla 2: War of the Monsters at GameFAQs

1992 video games
Godzilla games
Nintendo Entertainment System games
Nintendo Entertainment System-only games
North America-exclusive video games
Science fiction video games
Top-down video games
Turn-based strategy video games
Video game sequels
Video games developed in Japan
Video games set in Japan
Single-player video games